The Angolan records in swimming are the fastest ever performances of swimmers from Angola, which are recognised and ratified by the Federação Angolana de Natação.

All records were set in finals unless noted otherwise.

Long Course (50 m)

Men

Women

Mixed relay

Short Course (25 m)

Men

Women

Mixed relay

References

External links
 Federação Angolana de Natação web site

Angola
Records
Swimming
Swimming